Behle is  a surname. Notable people with this name include:

Aaron Behle, cast member of MTV's The Real World: Los Angeles (1993)
Daniel Behle (born 1974), German operatic tenor and composer
Frank Behle (1863–1939), American baseball executive
Jochen Behle (born 1960), German cross-country skier 
Petra Behle (born 1969), German biathlete
Renate Behle (born 1945), German opera singer, mother of Daniel 
William H. Behle (1909–2009), American ornithologist

See also
Behler (disambiguation)
Bohle
Buhle

de:Behle
fr:Behle
nds:Behle